Hunga Tonga–Hunga Haʻapai is a submarine volcano in the South Pacific located about  south of the submarine volcano of Fonuafoou and  north of Tongatapu, Tonga's main island. It is part of the highly active Kermadec-Tonga subduction zone and its associated volcanic arc, which extends from New Zealand north-northeast to Fiji, and is formed by the subduction of the Pacific Plate under the Indo-Australian Plate.

The volcano rises around 2,000 m from the seafloor and has a caldera which – on the eve of the 2022 eruption – was roughly 150 m below sea level and 4 km at its widest extent. The only major above-water part of the volcano are the twin uninhabited islands of Hunga Tonga and Hunga Haʻapai, which are respectively part of the northern and western rim of the caldera. As a result of the volcano's eruptive history, the islands existed as single landmass from 2015 to 2022: they were merged by a volcanic cone in a VEI 2 volcanic eruption in 2014–2015, and were separated again by a more explosive eruption in 2022, which also reduced the islands in size.

Its most recent eruption in January 2022 generated a tsunami that reached as far as the coasts of Japan and of the Americas and a volcanic plume that reached  into the mesosphere. As of May 2022 the eruption is the largest volcanic eruption in the 21st century. Hunga Tonga–Hunga Haʻapai likely had a previous major explosive eruption in the late 11th or early 12th century (possibly in 1108). Several known historical eruptions occurred in 1912, 1937, 1988, 2009, 2014–15 and 2021–22.

Volcano and caldera

Hunga Tonga–Hunga Haʻapai is a submarine volcano in the Kermadec-Tonga Ridge in South Pacific, a ridge formed by the convergent boundary where the Pacific Plate is subducted by the Indo-Australian Plate, forming a long volcanic and island chain. Hunga Tonga–Hunga Haʻapai volcano lies almost completely underwater, with the exception of two small volcanic islands, Hunga Tonga and Hunga Haapai. They are, respectively, the remnants of the northern and western rim of the volcano's caldera. The volcano's base at the seafloor is approximately 20 km in diameter, rising roughly 2,000 m towards the sea surface. Before the 2022 eruption, the volcano's caldera was roughly 150 m below sea-level, and had a size of 4 × 2 km. Its northern and southern portions were filled by volcanic deposits from previous eruptions. They are both composed largely of andesite and layered tephra deposits, with steep rocky cliffs. This andesite tends to be of the basaltic type.

Samples from the islands suggest a long eruptive history. One pyroclastic flow was dated to 1040–1180 CE, correlating to ash deposits found on Tongatapu, and to an unknown tropical eruption in 1108 CE that had produced 1 °C of global cooling. The caldera is believed to have been formed by this eruption. The 
2009 eruption arose from two vents located to the south and northwest of Hunga Haʻapai. The tephra deposited around each vent became connected to the island and nearly tripled its size, but such deposits disappeared with erosion in the following months.

Geography

Islands
Hunga Tonga and Hunga Haʻapai are the only subaerial parts of the volcano. Hunga Tonga is the eastern island, while Hunga Haʻapai is the western one. They are part of Tonga's Haʻapai group of islands, an island arc formed at the convergent boundary where the Pacific Plate subducts under the Indo-Australian Plate.

They are much smaller after the 2022 eruption. Neither island was developed due to a lack of an acceptable anchorage, although there were large guano deposits on each island.

The caldera itself has eroded rapidly in the southeast, originally allowing an opening that flooded the crater with seawater to form a bay. This bay has later become separated from the open ocean by a shallow sandbar, forming a lagoon. Initially it was believed that the entire island would be eroded rapidly, but by 2017, scientists believed that the process could take decades.

The islands figure in Tongan mythology as one of the few islands which were not overfished, and hence thrown down from heaven to land on earth. Tongans called them the islands which "jump back and forth" (i.e. suffer earthquakes). The first Europeans to see the islands were those with the Dutch explorers Willem Schouten and Jacob Le Maire in 1616. The British explorer Captain James Cook visited them several times in 1777 and learned their Tongan names.

History

2009 eruption

On 16 March 2009, a submarine eruption near Hunga Tonga–Hunga Haapai began spewing steam, smoke, pumice, and ash thousands of feet into the sky. The eruption had filled the gap between the two vents, creating new land surface that measured hundreds of square metres. The eruption devastated Hunga Haapai, covering it in black ash and stripping it of vegetation and fauna.

The volcanic eruption drew worldwide attention. The volcano was featured in a segment of the television program Angry Planet in 2009.

2014–2015 eruption

In November–December 2014, volcanic plumes and a series of earthquakes at volcanoes occurred north of Tonga for several weeks, indicating resumed volcanic activity in the area.

A new eruption began at Hunga Tonga–Hunga Haapai on 19 December 2014. Local fishermen reported a tall white steam plume rising from the ocean over the undersea volcanic mount. Satellite images taken on December 29 showed the eruption continuing, with a smoke and ash plume rising from the site, and discolored seawater (possibly caused by smoke and ash released below the surface, or by disturbance of the seabed). The eruption continued into 2015, with a tall ash cloud rising  into the sky on 6 January 2015.

The eruption entered a new stage on 11 January 2015, when the volcano began sending ash plumes as high as  into the sky. An Air New Zealand flight on 12 January had to be diverted to Samoa, while a number of other flights between New Zealand and Tonga were cancelled. An ash plume reached  on January 13. Large rocks and wet, dense ash were being ejected up to  into the air. By 16 January, a new island had been formed by the explosion.

Despite the volcano's eruption, which was spewing a steam cloud  into the air, international flights to Tonga resumed on 16 January, as volcano and aviation experts deemed the eruption no longer a threat to airliners.

Geologists from Tonga and New Zealand who visited the volcano on January 19 said the eruption had quieted in the last 24 hours. Emission of ash was limited, with magma rocks hitting the ocean causing some steam explosions. The team found no floating volcanic debris, such as pumice rafts, and the smell of volcanic gases was intermittent. Tongan officials established a zone  in diameter around the island to protect visitors from rock, ash, and acid rain.

Tongan officials declared the eruption at an end on 26 January, after observing no new gas, ash, or rock emerging from the island vent. Locals visiting the island said seabirds were nesting.

In June 2015, entrepreneur Ian Argus Stuart became the first person to overnight on this new island formation. Spending 11 nights on the island, Stuart survived eating nothing but seagull eggs and squid. Stuart went to Hunga Tonga with the help of the Spanish explorer Alvaro Cerezo, who provides castaway experiences to remote desert islands around the planet.

Post–2015 scientific study

In June 2017, French explorers Cécile Sabau and Damien Grouille landed the island from their sailing boat COLIBRI. Aside from taking some of the very few pictures of the island before it was decimated by the 2022 eruption, they collected a total of 16 rock samples, documented with GPS plotting and 3D pictures.

This material was studied by scientists at NASA Goddard Space Flight Center, led by Dr James B. Garvin. They studied Hunga Tonga–Hunga Haapai, using it as a model for volcanic shapes on Mars. In an article published in late 2017, the scientists concluded that Hunga Tonga–Hunga Haapai eroded in ways that are remarkably similar to the erosion patterns seen on similar landforms on Mars. The scientists noted that this suggested Mars was once flooded briefly by water, but that the water receded fairly quickly. They said that further study of the similarities between Hunga Tonga–Hunga Haapai and Martian volcanic landforms was needed.

Another analysis of the samples showed that the volcanic ash that forms much of Hunga Tonga–Hunga Haapai reacted with the warm oceanic water around it. This chemical reaction turned the ash into much harder rock, and volcanologists believed the island would last for several decades rather than be eroded. This made Hunga Tonga–Hunga Haapai only the third volcanic island in the last 150 years to survive more than a few months.

In October 2018, scientists visited the island and discovered that its surface was covered with gravel, sticky mud, and vegetation. The island was also populated by a variety of bird life. They also found that the island seemed to be eroding more quickly than previously thought, due to rainfall.

December 2021–January 2022 eruption

On 20 December 2021 the volcano erupted, causing a large plume that was visible from Nukuʻalofa. The Volcanic Ash Advisory Centre Wellington issued an advisory to airlines. The initial eruption continued until 2 am on 21 December. Activity continued, and on 25 December, satellite imagery showed that the island had increased in size.

As activity on the volcano decreased, it was declared dormant on 11 January before restarting on 14 January after the volcano sent an ash cloud . The Tongan government subsequently issued a tsunami warning. On the next day, the volcano violently erupted again, about seven times more powerfully than the eruption on 20 December 2021. The initial volcanic plume rose to  into the mesosphere, the greatest height ever reported for a vapor plume. There were numerous reports of loud booms across Tonga and other countries, such as Fiji and as far away as New Zealand and Australia. A boom was heard in Alaska,  from the source seven hours after eruption. The Met Office in the UK has also detected shockwaves from the eruption. The energy released by the eruption is estimated to have been equivalent to 61 Megatons (of TNT), more powerful than the largest nuclear bomb ever detonated. Near the eruption, the explosion damaged property, including shattered windows. A tsunami warning was issued just after 5:30 p.m. by the Tonga Meteorological Services and the tsunami flooded coastal areas in Tonga.

Two people were killed in Peru and two fishermen were injured in San Gregorio, California. Four deaths were confirmed in Tonga, including a British woman whose body was found after she went missing when the tsunami struck.

According to a report in the journal Geophysical Research Letters, while comparable to other volcanic eruptions on some measures, the 2022 Hunga Tonga–Hunga Haʻapai eruption sent unprecedented amounts of water vapor into the stratosphere.

It was reported on 16 January that radar surveys before and after the eruption show that most of the then island had been destroyed, and only small parts remained. These included remnants of Hunga Tonga and Hunga Haʻapai.

A survey of the caldera by a remote operated vehicle in August 2022 found continuing signs of volcanic activity.

See also

List of volcanoes in Tonga
List of islands and towns in Tonga
Surtsey, another recently formed volcanic island in Iceland
List of large volcanic eruptions

Footnotes

References

External links

 
 The Rise and Fall of Hunga Tonga-Hunga Ha'apai – Robert Waterman – Esri
"Underwater Volcano Erupts Off Tonga." BBC News. March 19, 2009. – Video showing the 18 March 2009, eruption
"Expedition To A New Island" – Explorer George Kourounis sets foot on a brand new volcanic island
"Hunga Tonga – The Volcano" – Local Tonga news of the 2022 eruption

Volcanoes of Tonga
Submarine calderas
Submarine volcanoes
Active volcanoes
Ephemeral islands
2014 in Tonga
Volcanic eruptions in Tonga
Islands of Tonga
Volcanic eruptions in 2021
Volcanic eruptions in 2022
VEI-6 volcanoes